TriBeCa (also known as Tribeca)  was a television drama anthology series  created by David J. Burke and co-produced with Robert De Niro and Jane Rosenthal for TriBeCa Productions in 1993 that aired on the Fox Network.  The series theme song, "Keep It Going," was performed by the alternative hip hop artist Me Phi Me.

For his performance in the lead role of Martin McHenry in the season opener, "The Box," Laurence Fishburne won a Primetime Emmy Award for Outstanding Guest Actor in a Drama Series.

Noted for attracting “actors, screenwriters and directors of uncommon quality,”  and set in New York City's lower Manhattan neighborhood of TriBeCa, the series was aired by the Fox Broadcasting Company.  The cast, with series regulars Philip Bosco and Joe Morton, included  Eli Wallach,  Kevin Spacey,  Kathleen Quinlan,  Melanie Mayron, Judith Malina,  Carl Lumbly,  Richard Lewis,  Carol Kane,  Debbie Harry,  Dizzy Gillespie and Danny Aiello III.

Directors and screenwriters included David J. Burke, Hans Tobeason, John Mankiewicz of the prolific Mankiewicz family, Barry Primus,  Bryan Spicer, Jeffrey Solomon and several actors in the series, among others.

Despite Fishburne's Emmy and critical acclaim, Fox cancelled the show after seven episodes for low ratings.

Episodes
TriBeCa aired seven episodes in its single 1993 season:

References

External links

1993 American television series debuts
1990s American anthology television series
1993 American television series endings
1990s American drama television series
Fox Broadcasting Company original programming
Primetime Emmy Award-winning television series
Tribeca
Television series by Sony Pictures Television
Television shows set in New York City